Amos/Magny Airport  is located  west of Amos, Quebec, Canada.

It is a public airport operated by the Town of Amos in the province of Quebec. It features a  asphalt runway.

References

Registered aerodromes in Abitibi-Témiscamingue
Buildings and structures in Amos, Quebec